Zoya Smirnowa (1897/98 – after 1916) was a Russian woman who fought during World War I disguised as a man. She and 11 other schoolmates disguised themselves as men so that they could fight in the war. Smirnowa was 16 when she enlisted; two of the women were as young as 14. They participated in the defense of Galicia and the Carpathians. Smirnowa became a representative of the group when she recounted their story to the English press.

As Smirnowa recounted to the newspapers, the girls left their Moscow school without informing anyone on the eighth day of mobilization — i.e. at the end of July 1914. They traveled to Lviv where they dressed as men and enlisted in the army undetected. When the first bombs fell on their position, they cried out, as did many of the men. One girl, Zina Morozov, was killed in the Carpathians when a bomb fell at her feet. She was buried by her friends. Two other girls were subsequently wounded. After Smirnowa was wounded, her gender was discovered.
  
Smirnowa's story was retold in Magnus Hirschfeld's The Sexual History of the World War (1930), a book that was later banned and burned during the Third Reich.

References
Hirschfeld, Magnus (1930). The Sexual History Of The World War (revised edition 1946). Cadillac Publishing. Page 100.
Jones, David E. (2000). Women Warriors: A History. Washington D.C.: Brassey's. p. 134 
Salmonson, Jessica Amanda (1991). The Encyclopedia of Amazons. Paragon House. Page 236. 
 This article was first printed in the Russian Journal Novoe Vremya, then in the London Times, and finally in Current History, Magazine of The New York Times, pp. 365–67.

1890s births

Year of death missing
Female wartime cross-dressers
Russian women of World War I
Russian military personnel of World War I
Women in the Imperial Russian military